Monroe, New York, may refer to two municipalities in Orange County, New York, in the United States:

Monroe (town), New York, a town in Orange County, New York
Monroe (village), New York, located entirely within the town
Monroe County, New York, a county in the western portion of New York state
West Monroe, New York,  a town in Oswego County, New York